Free Sardinia (Sardigna Libera, SL) is a social-democratic and independentist political party in Sardinia.

The party is led by Claudia Zuncheddu, a former regional councillor elected with Red Moors in the 2009 regional election. In May 2011 Zuncheddu ran for Mayor of Cagliari for a Sardinian nationalist coalition and gained just 2.4% of the vote. In April 2012 she officially launched her party.

In the run-up of the 2014 regional election Zuncheddu integrated her party into the regional section of Left Ecology Freedom (SEL) and stood as candidate in that party's list in Cagliari. She was not re-elected, but vowed to continue her political activity within SL.

References

External links
Official website

Political parties in Sardinia